Polina Tzekova (family name sometimes also transliterated as Tsekova) (Bulgarian Cyrillic: Полина Цекова) (born 30 April 1968, in Pleven) is an  international basketball player from Bulgaria, considered to be among the best female basketballers the country has ever produced. She has represented the Bulgaria women's national basketball team, averaging 18,5 points for the side. In 1999, Tzekova signed with the Houston Comets in the Women's National Basketball Association and was part of the roster that won the title at the end of the 1999 WNBA season.

She also competed in the women's tournament at the 1988 Summer Olympics.

References

1968 births
Living people
Sportspeople from Pleven
Bulgarian women's basketball players
French women's basketball players
Bulgarian emigrants to France
Centers (basketball)
Bulgarian expatriate basketball people in France
Houston Comets players
Tarbes Gespe Bigorre players
Olympic basketball players of Bulgaria
Basketball players at the 1988 Summer Olympics